Iron Warriors: T-72 Tank Command, known as T-72: Balkans on Fire! in Europe, is a tank-driving simulation by Russian game developers IDDK/Crazy House and published by Battlefront.com.

Summary 

The game is set during the Yugoslav wars of 1991–1995. The player is a Russian volunteer tank commander who is there to aid the Serbs. The player can use the T-72B (Ob'yekt 184), the T-55A (Ob'yekt 137G) and the T-34-85. The game has realistic physics, including the tank engine's complexity being simulated as well. The player can switch between the different tank positions, such as the driver, the gunner, the machine-gunner, and the commander.

Several players can play in multiplayer mode and occupy different stations in the same tank.

References

External links 
 

2004 video games
Tank simulation video games
Multiplayer vehicle operation games
Video games developed in Russia
Windows games
Windows-only games
Computer wargames
Strategy First games
Video games set in the 1990s
Video games set in Bosnia and Herzegovina
Yugoslav Wars in fiction
Multiplayer and single-player video games